An emergency fund, also known as contingency fund, is a personal budget set aside as a financial safety net for future mishaps or unexpected expenses. A critical part of financial planning, it is supposed to ensure one's personal finances are prepared for any emergency so that the risks of becoming dependent on credit, falling into debt, or running out of money in general are reduced if such a situation were to occur.

Emergency funds may be used in the case of job loss, medical emergencies, automobile problems, home appliance repairs/replacements and unplanned travel expenses.

Saving
The recommended amount of money to be allocated into an emergency fund depends on one's personal financial or economic situation. Generally, an adequate fund tends to cover six months' worth of expenses or more. In early adulthood, it is generally accepted one should save $500.

An emergency fund includes all the basic expenses like house rent, grocery expenses, electricity bills, phone bills, etc. It is recommended to start with creating an emergency fund while planning your finances.

See also
Rainy day fund

References

Personal finance